The 2008–09 A1 Grand Prix of Nations, New Zealand was an A1 Grand Prix race held at Taupo Motorsport Park, New Zealand.

Pre-race
The A1 Team Portugal’s sports director, Pedro Chaves has tested the A1GP car at the Autódromo Internacional do Algarve (Portugal) for promotional purposes.

Drivers

Qualifying 
The PowerBoost joker-style qualifying lap was not used for qualifying, with further review being made to determine its use in the following race.

It is the first time in A1GP history that the front row for both the Sprint and the Feature race has been the same since the introduction of the double qualifying sessions.

Sprint Race 
For safety concerns, regarding the "S" bend near the end of the lap, the Sprint Race featured a standing start, rather than the traditional rolling start.

* 25 second penalty added to time, for causing an avoidable collision

Feature Race 

* 25 second penalty added to time – USA for passing the white line at the end of the pit lane, Brazil for causing an avoidable collision

Notes 
 It was the 36th race weekend (72 starts).
 It was the 3rd race in New Zealand, and the 3rd at Taupo Motorsport Park.
 It was the first race as main driver for  Dan Clarke.
 It was the first race weekend as rookie driver for  António Félix da Costa,  Hubertus Bahlsen,  Adderly Fong and  Cristiano Morgado.
Records:
  Portugal and Filipe Albuquerque scored their first fastest lap.
  Neel Jani tied with  Alex Yoong for the most A1GP starts – 54.
  Neel Jani score 8 fastest laps.

References

External links
Ireland Sprints ahead
Sprint Race results
Sprint Race: lap-by-lap
Just what the doctor ordered (Feature Race article)
Feature Race results
Feature Race: lap-by-lap

A1 Grand Prix Of Nations, New Zealand, 2008-09
A1 Grand Prix Of Nations, New Zealand, 2008-09
Taupō
Motorsport competitions in New Zealand
January 2009 sports events in New Zealand